Federico Fuligni (born 1 June 1995) is an Italian motorcycle racer. In 2021 he races in the Supersport World Championship aboard a Yamaha YZF-R6.

His younger brother Filippo is also a racer.

Career 

Career statistics

Grand Prix motorcycle racing

By season

Races by year
(key) (Races in bold indicate pole position; races in italics indicate fastest lap)

Supersport World Championship

Races by year
(key) (Races in bold indicate pole position; races in italics indicate fastest lap)

 Season still in progress.

External links

1995 births
Living people
Italian motorcycle racers
Moto2 World Championship riders
Sportspeople from Bologna
Supersport World Championship riders